Bhagya Devathe is a 1968 Indian Kannada-language film, directed by Rathnakar-Madhu and produced by V Sundareshan. The film stars Rajkumar, K. S. Ashwath, Narasimharaju and Balakrishna. The film had musical score by Gnanamani. The movie is based on the folklore Kaadu Siddammana Kathe.

Cast

Rajkumar
K. S. Ashwath as Madhu Shetty
Narasimharaju as Mridanga
Balakrishna
M. P. Shankar
Leelavathi as Siddhi, Madhu Shetty's daughter
B. V. Radha
Udaya Chandrika
Ramadevi
M. N. Lakshmi Devi as Sangeetha
Advani Lakshmi Devi
Shanthamma
Prashanth (credited as Baby Prashanth)
Vishalakshi (credited as Baby Vishalakshi)
H. R. Shastry
Anantharam Maccheri
Krishna Shastry
Hanumantha Rao
Shyam
Nagaraj
N. A. Subbanna
Comedian Guggu
Jyothi

References

External links
 
 

1968 films
1960s Kannada-language films